Pereire–Levallois is a station in Paris's express suburban rail system, the RER. It is in the 17th arrondissement of Paris.

Adjacent station 
 Pereire on Paris Métro Line 3.
 Shuttle buses connect Pont Cardinet on SNCF rail station.

See also 
 List of stations of the Paris RER
 List of stations of the Paris Métro

References

External links 

 

Réseau Express Régional stations
Railway stations in Paris
Railway stations in France opened in 1854
Buildings and structures in the 17th arrondissement of Paris